This is a list of diseases of foliage plants belonging to the family Arecaceae.

Plant Species

Bacterial diseases

Fungal diseases

Nematodes, parasitic

References 

 Common Names of Diseases, The American Phytopathological Society

Foliage plant (Palmae)
Palm diseases